The Football League play-offs for the 2008–09 season were held in May 2009, with the finals taking place at Wembley Stadium in London. The play-off semi-finals were played over two legs and were contested by the teams who finished in 3rd, 4th, 5th and 6th place in the Football League Championship and League One tables, and the 4th, 5th, 6th and 7th placed teams in League Two. The semi-final winners progressed to the finals, with the winner of each match earning promotion for the following season.

Burnley and Sheffield United contested the Championship play-off final, having defeated Reading and Preston North End respectively in the semi-finals. Burnley secured promotion to the Premier League with a 1–0 victory, courtesy of a goal from Wade Elliott. In the League One final, Scunthorpe United won 3–2 against Millwall; Leeds United and MK Dons were the other teams to reach the play-offs. In League Two, Gillingham won their semi-final against Rochdale and then secured promotion with a 1–0 victory against Shrewsbury, who had beaten Bury in their semi-final.

Background
The Football League play-offs have been held every year since 1987. They take place for each division following the conclusion of the regular season and are contested by the four clubs finishing below the automatic promotion places.

In the Championship, Sheffield United, who had been relegated from the Premier League under controversial circumstances in 2007, finished 3 points behind second placed Birmingham City, who in turn had finished 7 points off the champions Wolverhampton Wanderers. Reading - who were aiming to return to the Premier League at the first attempt - were in fourth place in the table. Burnley and Preston North End were only a couple of points further back on 76 and 74 respectively. Neither of the latter had played in the Premier League before, with Preston's last spell in the top division ending in 1961. Burnley were relegated from in the top flight in 1976.

Championship

Semi-finals
First leg

Second leg

Sheffield United won 2–1 on aggregate.

Burnley won 3–0 on aggregate.

Final

League One

Semi-finals
First leg

Second leg

Millwall won 2–1 on aggregate.

Milton Keynes Dons 1–1 Scunthorpe United on aggregate. Scunthorpe United won 7–6 on penalties.

Final

League Two

Semi-finals
First leg

Second leg

Bury 1–1 Shrewsbury Town on aggregate. Shrewsbury Town won 4–3 on penalties.

Gillingham won 2–1 on aggregate.

Final

References

External links
Football League website

 
Play-offs
English Football League play-offs
May 2009 sports events in the United Kingdom